Columbus Union Station was a union station in Columbus, Georgia. The building was built in 1901 and was designed in the Second Empire style by the architectural firm, Bruce and Morgan. The station hosted the Central Railroad of Georgia, the Seaboard Air Line Railroad and the Southern Railway. It was located at 1200 Sixth Avenue, directly north of 12th Street, Columbus.

By 1932 Seaboard Air Line passenger trains stopped calling at the station, as the road's operations through Columbus became freight-only. The SAL previously had run passenger trains to Richland, then to Albany.

Notable passenger train service
At the opening of the 1940s service included:
Central of Georgia:
City of Miami (Chicago - Miami)
Floridan (Chicago - Miami)
Man O' War (Atlanta - Columbus via Newnan)
Seminole (Chicago - Jacksonville, with through sleepers to Miami)

Additionally, the Central of Georgia operated local morning and afternoon trains from Birmingham through Columbus to Macon. In the latter 1940s and early 1950s this became a night train route with trains going continuous beyond Macon to Savannah (Central of Georgia Depot). By late 1953 all passenger service between Columbus and Macon had ended.

Southern Railway:
The Southern operated a local train from Columbus to Atlanta via Warm Springs, Griffin and McDonough. Passenger service on this route was discontinued between 1946 and 1949.

The last trains operating out of Columbus in early 1971 were the Man O' War and the City of Miami. Passenger services ended and the station closed, with the passing of passenger operations to Amtrak on May 1, 1971.

Disposition in recent decades
Union Station was added to the National Register of Historic Places in 1980. However, the building was vulnerable to demolition. Yet, various activists, and the Historic Columbus Foundation, Southern Railway System, and the Consolidated Government of Columbus mobilized to save the station.

The building remains intact and serves as the chamber of commerce office for the metropolitan area.

References
Notes

Bibliography

Former railway stations in Georgia (U.S. state)
Former Southern Railway (U.S.) stations
Railway stations in Georgia (U.S. state)
Seaboard Air Line Railroad stations
Union stations in the United States
Railway stations in the United States opened in 1901
Railway stations closed in 1971